Chelten Avenue station is a SEPTA Regional Rail station in Philadelphia, Pennsylvania. Located on West Chelten Avenue in the Germantown neighborhood, it serves the Chestnut Hill West Line. The concrete station structure, part of a Pennsylvania Railroad grade-separation project completed in 1918 in conjunction with electrification of the line, was designed by William Holmes Cookman.

A station has been at this location since June 11, 1884. Known initially as Germantown, the 1918 station was named Chelten Avenue to avoid confusion with the Philadelphia & Reading Railroad's Germantown. The original station building was a two-story stone structure at street level on the outbound side. Retained in that general location after the 1918 grade separation, it was demolished circa 1958, replaced by a small brick ticket office on the inbound side which remains in use today.

The station is in zone 1 on the Chestnut Hill West Line, on former PRR tracks, and is 8.1 track miles from Suburban Station. It contains  concrete-arch covered staircases on all four corners of the Chelten Avenue Bridge over the tracks leading to the station platforms. In 2004, this station saw 441 boardings on an average weekday. Despite having high-level platforms, the station is not ADA accessible, as it lacks ramps or elevators from the street down to platform level.

Station layout

References

External links

SEPTA – Chelten Avenue Station
 Chelten Avenue entrance from Google Maps Street View

SEPTA Regional Rail stations
Former Pennsylvania Railroad stations
Railway stations in the United States opened in 1884
Railway stations in Philadelphia